Trouble Preferred is a 1948 American thriller film directed by James Tinling, written by Arnold Belgard, and starring Peggy Knudsen, Lynne Roberts, Charles Russell, Paul Langton, Marcia Mae Jones and Mary Bear. It was released on December 31, 1948, by 20th Century Fox.

Plot
Two rookie policewomen investigate a woman's apparent suicide attempt.

Cast   
Peggy Knudsen as Dale Kent
Lynne Roberts as Madge Walker
Charles Russell as Lt. Rod Brooks
Paul Langton as Ed Poole
Marcia Mae Jones as Virginia Evans
Mary Bear as Sgt. Hazel Craine
James Cardwell as Hal 'Tuffy' Tucker
June Storey as Hilary Vincent
Paul Guilfoyle as Baby Face Charlie

References

External links 
 

1948 films
20th Century Fox films
American thriller films
1940s thriller films
Films directed by James Tinling
American black-and-white films
1940s English-language films
1940s American films